Vyan Sampson (born 2 July 1996) is a Jamaican professional footballer who plays as a defender for Heart of Midlothian in the Scottish Women's Premier League for the Jamaica women's national team.

Club career
Sampson began her career in the youth ranks at Charlton Athletic before joining FA WSL 1 club Arsenal in 2011. Originally she played with the youth and reserve teams, where she won both domestic cups at reserve level and the League Cup with the Under-17s. She remained in the lower levels of Arsenal for three years between 2011 and 2014 before being promoted into the first-team squad, her competitive debut came on 12 October 2014 in the club's final WSL match of the season; a 3–1 home win versus Everton.

In the following season, 2015, Sampson made just one league appearance for Arsenal but did play four times in the FA WSL Cup which Arsenal went on to win after a 3–0 final win against Notts County; Sampson was substituted on for the final few minutes. At the start of 2016, Sampson signed a new contract with Arsenal. However, three months later she suffered a knee injury which ruled her out for four months. In April 2018, Sampson began featuring for West Ham United of the FA Women's Premier League Southern Division. On 19 June, as West Ham moved into the WSL for 2018–19, Sampson signed a contract with the club.

In August 2019, Sampson joined newly formed Championship outfit London City Lionesses on loan.

In September 2020, Sampson joined San Marino Academy in Serie A. She was named to one matchday squad but did not make an appearance.

On 28 January 2021, Sampson joined Charlton Athletic on a permanent contract until the end of the 2020–21 season.

International career
Sampson has represented England at Under-17 and Under-19 level. Her debut for England U17s came on 13 April 2012 in a home defeat to Iceland in a 2012 UEFA Women's Under-17 Championship qualifier. She made four further appearances throughout 2014 for England U17s and scored one goal; versus Israel in qualifying for the 2013 UEFA Women's Under-17 Championship. In 2013, Sampson made the move into the England U19s and made her debut on 4 April against Serbia. Another qualifying appearance came before she was selected by England for the 2014 UEFA Women's Under-19 Championship, she played the full minutes in her nation's opening two games before missing the third and final game as England were knocked out at the group stage.

Following the historic FIFA Women's World Cup qualification by the Jamaica national team, Sampson was invited to their training camp roster in January 2019.

Career statistics
.

Honours
Arsenal
 FA WSL Cup: 2015

References

External links
Vyan Sampson profile on Arsenal's website

1996 births
Living people
Citizens of Jamaica through descent
Jamaican women's footballers
Women's association football defenders
Jamaica women's international footballers
Jamaican expatriate women's footballers
Jamaican expatriates in San Marino
Expatriate footballers in San Marino
Footballers from Greater London
English women's footballers
FA Women's National League players
Women's Super League players
Arsenal W.F.C. players
West Ham United F.C. Women players
London City Lionesses players
Charlton Athletic W.F.C. players
San Marino Academy players
English sportspeople of Jamaican descent
Black British sportswomen
English expatriate women's footballers
English expatriates in San Marino
Heart of Midlothian W.F.C. players